The Hit List is the seventh studio album, and the first cover album by Joan Jett. The album was released in 1990. All of the tracks are covers of famous songs.

"Dirty Deeds" was released as the first single, backed with the non-LP track "Let It Bleed", a cover of The Rolling Stones song. It peaked at No. 36 on the Billboard Hot 100. "Love Hurts" was released as the second single, backed with "Handyman" from Jett's 1983 album Album, but it failed to chart in the US. In foreign markets, the song was paired with "Up From the Skies"; in the UK, it was issued by Chrysalis Records with "Pretty Vacant" as its B-side.

Track listing

Personnel

The Blackhearts
 Joan Jett – rhythm guitar, lead vocals, co-producer 
 Ricky Byrd – lead guitar, backing vocals
 Kasim Sulton – bass, backing vocals
 Thommy Price – drums

Additional musicians
 Sandy Gennaro – drums
 Ray Davies, Peppy Castro – guitar, vocals
 Ronnie Lawson – keyboards
 Bashiri Johnson – percussion
 Darlene Love, Chuck Kentis – backing vocals

The Uptown Horns
 Crispin Cioe – baritone saxophone
 Robert Funk – trombone
 Arno Hecht – tenor saxophone
 Paul Litteral – trumpet
 Kenny Laguna – various instruments and backing vocals

Production
 Kenny Laguna – production
 Thom Panunzio – co-producer, engineer, mixing
 Jay Healy – engineering, mixing of "Have You Ever Seen the Rain?"
 Tom Cadley, John Aiosa, Paul Logas – engineering
 Tom Fritze, Rick Travali, Robert Smith, Michael Gilbert, Andrew Grassi – assistant engineers
 Bob Ludwig – mastering at Masterdisk, New York

Charts

References

Joan Jett albums
1990 albums
Albums produced by Thom Panunzio
Covers albums
Blackheart Records albums
Columbia Records albums
Chrysalis Records albums